Yinghuangia seranimata is a bacterium species from the genus Yinghuangia which has been isolated from soil from the tree Cephalotaxus fortunei in Xishuangbanna in the Yunnan Province in China.

References

External links
Type strain of Streptomyces seranimatus at BacDive -  the Bacterial Diversity Metadatabase	

Streptomycineae
Bacteria described in 2012